Ali Salimi (1922 in Baku – 22 April 1997 in Tabriz) was an Iranian Azerbaijani musician, composer and tar player. He had been based in Tehran for the last few decades where he made significant contribution to promotion and development of Azerbaijani music.

Many years before his birth, his father had migrated from Mehmandost village of Ardabil city to Baku to earn livelihood. Ali Salimi attended the classes of the Azerbaijani musician, Ahmad Bakikhanov and after a short while he showed such an aptitude for music that Ahmad Bakikhanov introduced him to the National Orchestra of Azerbaijan. In Stalin's time, because Ali Salimi's father did not want to change his nationality, he returned to Iran along with his family in 1938 (1317 Hijri), resided in his home town, Ardabil, and obtained a birth certificate in his city.

In 1965 (1344 Hijri) when the singer of Baku Rashid Behbudov had come to Iran to have concerts, he was very impressed when he listened to the composition Ayriliq, and asked Ali Salimi for permission to play that composition in Baku.

Ali Salimi was invited to Tabriz in 1981 as the director of the East Azarbaijan Province TV Orchestra. He conducted the orchestra till his death in 1997, and in the meantime established a private music school in Iran for Azerbaijani music in 1984.

His statue is at the site of cultural organization UNESCO. Ali Salimi obtained degree 5 (the highest degree in the art of music) in composition from Azerbaijan Republic, and he was the official member of the prominent composers of Baku.

He died at the age of 74 on 22 April 1997 from cerebral apoplexy.

Compositions
Gül Ardabil
Ayriliq
Size Salam Getirmishem
Savalan
Heidar Baba
Ilgar
Bahar galdi
Aglama
Gözüm ana
Gül achdi
Laleh
Yasha mahabbat
Ana laylasi
Hagh yolu
Gözal giz
Sanin sözün
Yalan donya
Ay dolandi
Party
Domandi
Ana vatan
Bivafalar
Könül
Namaz
Gülshan
Aziz Iran
Yagishlar
Fuzuli üchün
Azadligh ghoshalari
Telli giz
Birlik
Babam üchün'''Azerbaijan (1)Azerbaijan (2)VatanimKorogluÖlkamizSözlarSani isteyiram''

See also
 Music of Azerbaijan

References

External links
ali salimi
 Best Azeri musicians to receive Master Ali Salimi Plaque
Ali Salimi on Azerbaijan International
 yeshilyol.blogfa.com 
 fardi.net 

1922 births
Azerbaijani folk poets
1997 deaths
Azerbaijani composers
Azerbaijani musicians
People from Ardabil
People's Artists of Azerbaijan
Soviet Azerbaijani people
20th-century poets
20th-century composers
Soviet emigrants to Iran